Kingston College may refer to:

Kingston College (Queensland), Logan City, Australia
Kingston College (British Columbia), Canada
 Kingston College, part of South Thames Colleges Group, London
Kingston College (Jamaica), Jamaica
Kingston College (Chile), Concepción, Chile
 Kingston College of Art, a former name of Kingston School of Art, London
 Kingston College of Science, India

See also
Kingston Bible College, an Independent Fundamental Baptist College in Kingston, Nova Scotia, Canada